William Walsh (23 February 1916 – 23 June 1996) was successively Professor of Education, Professor of Commonwealth Literature and Acting Vice-Chancellor at the University of Leeds.

Academic career
Walsh graduated in English from Downing College, Cambridge in 1943 and worked as a schoolmaster before becoming a Lecturer in Education at the University College of North Staffordshire (now Keele University) in 1951.  After a similar post at the University of Edinburgh, he was appointed Professor and Head of the Department of Education at the University of Leeds in 1957. 

He served as Pro-Vice-Chancellor at Leeds from 1965 to 1967.

In 1972 Walsh was appointed Professor of Commonwealth Literature in the School of English, also at Leeds University. 

Following the death in September 1981 of the incumbent Vice-Chancellor, Lord Boyle of Handsworth, Walsh delayed his retirement and served for two years from 1981 to 1983 as Acting Vice-Chancellor.  Walsh retired from Leeds in 1983 with the title Emeritus Professor and was succeeded as Vice-Chancellor by Sir Edward Parkes.  Walsh was awarded the degree of Doctor of Laws (LLD) honoris causa in 1984. 

Walsh gave the 1983 John Keats Memorial Lecture.

Personal life
Walsh married May Watson in 1945.  They had a son and daughter.

Death
Walsh died in Leeds on 23 June 1996, aged 80.

References
The Independent 13 July 1996 Obituary: Professor William Walsh

 

1916 births
1996 deaths
Alumni of Downing College, Cambridge
Academics of Keele University
Academics of the University of Edinburgh
Vice-Chancellors of the University of Leeds
Academics of the University of Leeds
British educational theorists